The Golden Globe Award for Best Original Score is a Golden Globe Award presented by the Hollywood Foreign Press Association (HFPA), an organization of journalists who cover the United States film industry, but are affiliated with publications outside North America, since its institution in 1947.

History
Since the 5th Golden Globe Awards (1947), the award is presented annually, except from 1953 to 1958. The nominations from 1947 and 1948 are not available. The first Best Original Score award went to Max Steiner for his compositional work on Life with Father.

John Williams is the artist with the most nominations (24); those resulted in 4 wins. Dimitri Tiomkin had the same number of wins, but out of only 5 nominations. Other notable achievers include Maurice Jarre (10 nominations, 4 wins), Alan Menken (5 nominations, 3 wins), Hans Zimmer (15 nominations, 3 wins),  Justin Hurwitz (3 nominations, 3 wins) and Alexandre Desplat (11 nominations, 2 wins). 

Artists like Jerry Goldsmith (9 nominations) and Michel Legrand (7 nominations) were nominated several times but never received the award. Dimitri Tiomkin, Alan Menken and Howard Shore are the only composers to win two consecutive awards. Additionally, Dimitri Tiomkin received Special Achievement Awards for his services to film music in 1955 and 1957, as did Hugo Friedhofer in 1958. The most recent recipient of this award was Justin Hurwitz for the film Babylon.

Winners and nominees
Key

1940s

1950s

1960s

1970s

1980s

1990s

2000s

2010s

2020s

See also
 Academy Award for Best Original Score
 BAFTA Award for Best Film Music
 Critics' Choice Movie Award for Best Score
 Grammy Award for Best Score Soundtrack for Visual Media
 Grammy Award for Best Compilation Soundtrack for Visual Media

Notes
1. The year indicates the period for which the awards are given and not the year in which the ceremony took place.

References
Specific

General
 

Film awards for best score
Score Original
Lists of films by award
Awards established in 1948